The 2014–15 Houston Baptist Huskies women's basketball team represents Houston Baptist University in the 2014–15 college basketball season. This is head coach Donna Finnie's second season as head coach at HBU. The Huskies play their home games at the Sharp Gymnasium and are members of the Southland Conference.

Media
All Houston Baptist games will be broadcast online live by Legacy Sports Network (LSN) with audio for all road games and video for all home games.

Roster

Schedule and results

|-
!colspan=9 style="background:#002366; color:#FF7F00;"| Out of Conference Schedule

|-
!colspan=9 style="background:#002366; color:#FF7F00;"| Southland Conference Schedule

|-
!colspan=9 style="background:#002366; color:#FF7F00;"| Southland Conference Tournament

See also
2014–15 Houston Baptist Huskies men's basketball team

References

Houston Christian Huskies women's basketball seasons
Houston Baptist
Houston Baptist Huskies basketball
Houston Baptist Huskies basketball